Coloniales is an order of invertebrates belonging to the class Entoprocta.

Families:
 Loxosomatidae

References

Entoprocta